The Spring Creek Lodge is a historic former restaurant at 18389 Old Glenn Highway in the Chugiak area of Anchorage, Alaska. Vernon and Alma Haik built the Spring Creek Lodge in 1949. It served as an essential eatery and community center in southcentral Alaska from 1949 to 1974. The lodge was famous for its homemade bread and banana cream pies, and it was the place to go for a hearty Sunday dinner. For 25 years, the lodge served homesteaders, hunters from the Matanuska Valley, and military personnel from the Elmendorf Air Force Base and Fort Richardson in Anchorage. The lodge stands at Mile 20 on the two-lane Palmer Highway (now called Old Glenn Highway) halfway between Palmer and Anchorage. It also served as the first community center for the early settlers of Chugiak. On September 9, 2001, the Spring Creek Lodge was inducted to the National Register of Historic Places "in recognition of its contributions to the cultural heritage of Alaska." The restaurant was a local landmark until its location was bypassed by the new Glenn Highway in 1969, after which it closed.

The Haiks 

Facing the hardships of the Great Depression, Vernon and Alma Haik set out to Alaska in search of new opportunities. The Haiks were among the many men and women who left economically depressed cities to homestead rural areas and create self-sustained communities.  When the Haiks arrived in 1936, the valley they had hoped to homestead was closed off for the Matanuska Valley Project – an experimental farming community which was part of a New Deal resettlement program. Their plans were delayed until, ten years later, a post-World War II construction boom at Fort Richardson promised jobs and a stable infrastructure in Anchorage. The Haik family moved to Anchorage in 1946 and Vern Haik worked as a surveyor at Fort Richardson.

Community involvement 
As one of six families in the area between Palmer and Anchorage, the Haik family were very involved in their small community of homesteads and they headed up many initiatives. Alma and Vernon Haik were instrumental in founding the town of Chugiak, establishing telephone lines, petitioning for a local schoolhouse, and bringing electricity to the area. Vernon also served as the first mayor when Chugiak was established as a town.

Telephone lines 

After unsuccessfully petitioning the Matanuska Telephone Association to establish a telephone system in Chugiak, the Haiks and six Chugiak families were determined to do it themselves. They went to the army auction in Anchorage and bid on surplus telephone field wire and two types of hand-crank phones from the army: one phone could be carried on the shoulder into battlefields, the other phone was made of oak and could be mounted on the wall. In the dead of winter, the families used dogsleds to string wire "up and down the highway between homesteads and made up a system using long and short rings." Starting at the Spring Creek Lodge, they transported a telephone line to a captain's house in Birchwood – this provided Birchwood residents with a place to call in the event of fire, since the line also tied into the volunteer fire department at Moosehorn.

Chugiak's first school 
Because Anchorage and Palmer were quite a distance away, the Chugiak families needed a local school for their children. After petitioning the territorial government, they were promised a school teacher if they could find a schoolhouse. Their attempts to find a location were thwarted by the railroad depot and the U.S. commissioner in Juneau, who didn't believe the community had enough people to warrant a school precinct. At about the same time, Justine Parks was spearheading the campaign to establish a local voting precinct in Chugiak so the residents could cast votes locally. On October 12, 1948 – for what they hoped would be the last time – the Chugiak community trekked up to Anchorage to make their voices heard. They cast a total of 31 votes, much more than the commissioner expected, and Chugiak was granted a local voting precinct. Two years later, the territorial government recognized their burgeoning community and agreed to build their school. Vernon Haik had always been an active advocate for the cause, and he was appointed the first school agent for Chugiak Elementary. In preparation for the first wave of 66 students, Vern tracked down school materials and books at Fort Richardson. Chugiak's first school was ready in October 1951.

Chugiak's first mayor 
A driven man with an aptitude for organizing, Vern Haik was elected Chugiak's first mayor. He quickly planned a day of celebration for the hard-working community, and he announced that the coming Memorial Day weekend would be the Chugiak Spring Carnival. The entire town threw themselves into preparations for the festivities, as mayors from neighboring cities, the Governor, and people from all over Alaska were invited. During the opening day ceremonies, instead of presenting the Governor with a key to the city, Vern Haik presented him with an axe. He explained that it was a more appropriate symbol of the community, "who had hewn their homes from raw land." The three-day celebration was an enormous success; the crowds enjoyed motorcycle races, food booths, beauty contests, fortune tellers, and carnival games under sunshine and clear skies. The local paper called it "the miracle of Chugiak" and an editorial in the Anchorage Times declared, "There's a new town on the map of Alaska today ..."

Early years 

Electricity was still a luxury household utility in 1949. For the first year of business, the Haiks ran the Spring Creek Lodge off-the-grid, employing the natural landscape to provide refrigeration. The creek was frigid year-round with a high of 38°, so the hamburger and milk were stored in a 10-gallon crock pot submerged in the freezing creek. When a food order was received, one of the Haik sisters would sprint to the creek and fetch the amount needed for cooking. At night, the cabin was lit with Coleman gas lanterns and Aladdin lamps.

Menu 
Breakfast patrons looking for a quick pick-me-up might have chosen two doughnuts and a cup of coffee for 35 cents, according to an early menu that has been preserved in family scrapbooks. Hungrier customers would have dug deeper into their pockets for a full, cooked breakfast for $1.85.

A typical dinner at the lodge consisted of sirloin steak, baked ham or barbecued spare ribs, along with potatoes, candied yams, a side of vegetables, and tea or coffee. The Haiks included homemade bread in every dinner order — and of course, pie. Most dinners cost $2.85.

Patrons eating just dessert paid 35 cents for a piece of cake or a slice of pie, another nickel would buy you the house specialty. Although it sounds like steal by today's standards, the Lodge was not considered cheap eats at the time. It was a special occasion to eat out and many families made a ritual of going to the Lodge for Sunday lunch after church. Due to the remote location, many food items required a freight charge. As many ingredients as possible were locally sourced. The rich cream used in the banana cream pies came from the Matanuska Maid dairy co-op just down the road, but items like bananas had to be transported all the way from Seattle.

Customers

Elmendorf Air Force Base and Fort Richardson 
After World War II the military shifted its centers to address the new Soviet threat; subsequently, Alaska became one of the main theaters of operation for the Cold War. Because of its vicinity to the Soviet Union, the military mission in Alaska centered on maintaining a deterrence against Soviet aggression and providing a training environment for Arctic, cold region warfare.  On June 8, 1940, construction began to establish Elmendorf Air Force Base as a permanent military airfield. Two months later, the first Air Corps personnel arrived. The field played a vital role as the main air logistics center and staging area; as the base expanded, it eventually merged with the nearby Fort Richardson. With the influx of military personnel, the Spring Creek Lodge quickly became the go-to destination. The lodge was famous for its cozy atmosphere with smells of homemade bread and meals served by the Haik sisters. Meetings were held over dinner and pie and it was not uncommon to see military drills being performed in the parking lot.

The Homestead Acts in Alaska 

The Homestead Act of 1862 was signed by Abraham Lincoln to prompt western expansion. The act offered up to 160 acres of free land in western states or territories to people who were willing to live on the land for 5 years, develop it for agriculture, and build a house on the land. If the requirements had been accomplished, after 5 years that person could receive full ownership of their 160-acre parcel. This opportunity would continue for over 123 years and prove instrumental in not only developing the western states but allowing millions of Americans to own their own private parcel of land.

As the more developed eastern states endured the growing pangs of industrialization, the government initiated new legislation to encourage citizens to move West and seek out new opportunities. Although the Alaskan land had been free since 1898, many prospective homesteaders were deterred by the difficult realities such as poor soil, weather, and transportation. By 1914, less than 200 applicants had been received in Alaska.

After WWII and the Vietnam War, applications increased as reunited young families sought out land ownership opportunities. On October 21, 1976, the Federal Land Policy and Management Act of 1976 repealed the Homestead Act of 1862, but a provision permitted homesteading to continue in Alaska until 1986.

Construction 
The one-story building is made of peeled logs and has a T-shaped plan with a shallow cross-gable roof. The logs are milled on two sides to provide level surfaces for stacking them. The logs retain round ends that extend a foot past the corners. A butt joint is used to join the logs at the corners. The gable ends have split log vertical siding applied over milled wood framing. The building's main section measures 20 by 36 feet. The kitchen and storeroom section, added on the back of the building in 1950, measure 10 by 24 feet.

See also 
 National Register of Historic Places listings in Anchorage, Alaska
 Joint Base Elmendorf–Richardson

References

1949 establishments in Alaska
Buildings and structures completed in 1949
Commercial buildings on the National Register of Historic Places in Alaska
Houses in Anchorage, Alaska
Buildings and structures on the National Register of Historic Places in Anchorage, Alaska
Restaurants in Alaska
Roadside attractions in Alaska
Territory of Alaska
Log buildings and structures on the National Register of Historic Places in Alaska
Restaurants on the National Register of Historic Places
1969 disestablishments in Alaska